Ian Wilkie (born July 20, 1949) is a Canadian former professional ice hockey goaltender. He played in the World Hockey Association (WHA) for the New York Raiders, Los Angeles Sharks, and Edmonton Oilers.

Born in Edmonton, Alberta, Wilkie played major junior hockey with the hometown Edmonton Oil Kings, joining the team for the 1966–67 season, and was their starting goaltender from 1967–68 to 1969–70.

Wilkie's son is Edmonton-based firefighter and politician Jordan Wilkie.

References

External links
 Edmonton Oilers: Goaltending History
 

1949 births
Canadian ice hockey goaltenders
Edmonton Oil Kings (WCHL) players
Edmonton Oilers (WHA) players
Greensboro Generals (SHL) players
Living people
Los Angeles Sharks players
Montreal Canadiens draft picks
New York Raiders players
Ice hockey people from Edmonton
UBC Thunderbirds players